Zaidpur is a constituency of the Uttar Pradesh Legislative Assembly covering the city of Zaidpur in the Barabanki district of Uttar Pradesh, India.

Zaidpur is one of five assembly constituencies in the Barabanki Lok Sabha constituency. Since 2008, this assembly constituency is numbered 269 amongst 403 constituencies.

Upendra Singh won in last Assembly election of 2017 Uttar Pradesh Legislative Elections defeating Indian National Congress candidate Tanuj Punia by a margin of 29,181 votes.

Election results

2022

2019

See also
Zaidpur, Barabanki

Notes

External links
 

Assembly constituencies of Uttar Pradesh
Barabanki district